The Green European Journal is an online and biannual print magazine that publishes analysis, debates, and interviews on political ecology, current affairs, and topics of significance to the green movement. The journal is published in English and offers translations in 21 languages.

Overview
The magazine was established in 2012, with the objective of providing a venue for European-level debate amongst the green movement in Europe.

Supported by the European Parliament., the  Green  European Journal is  linked  to  but  editorially independent from the Green European Foundation.

Although based in Brussels, Belgium, the magazine covers analysis on a European-wide context. It has various partner organisations and publications in different European countries, including Bright Green, Krytyka Polityczna, and the Heinrich Böll Foundation, among others.

Print edition
The Green European Journal’s printed editions take an in-depth look at a given topic and appear about two times a year. The first issue published in 2012 focussed on the European economic crisis. Subsequent issues have covered various topics, including climate change, degrowth, agriculture, security, COVID-19, among others.

The print issues are designed by Claire Allard and feature illustrations by the Belgian illustrator Klaas Verplancke. They are available to read online and order in print.

Online media
The magazine publishes articles online throughout the year on its website on a variety of topics ranging from the Green New Deal and decolonial ecology to the geopolitics of climate breakdown. It publishes predominately in English along with articles and translations in 21 other languages.

Podcast 
The magazine also publishes audio versions of selected articles in the form of a podcast titled Green Wave. It was listed as one of the best podcasts on EU politics by policylab.eu. It is available on all podcast platforms to listen to and download.

Notable Contributors 
Notable authors whose work has been published in the Green European Journal include Vandana Shiva, Amitav Ghosh, Rosi Braidotti, Ulrike Guérot, Michel Bauwens, Natalie Bennett, Daniel Cohn-Bendit, Olivier De Schutter, Cory Doctorow, Joschka Fischer, David Graeber, Chantal Mouffe, Kate Raworth, and Yanis Varoufakis.

Awards 
The Green European Journal has been awarded the House of eu. and was recognized as one of the best .eu websites of 2019 by EURid.

References

External links

 Green European Journal E-shop
 Green Wave Podcast
 Green European Journal Twitter
 Green European Journal Facebook
 Green European Journal LinkedIn

2012 establishments in Belgium
Biannual magazines
Magazines established in 2012
Magazines published in Brussels
Political magazines